Mihajlo Ivančević (born 7 April 1999) is a Serbian professional footballer who plays as a centre back for Danish Superliga club OB.

Club career
On 27 January 2022 it was confirmed, that Ivančević had joined Danish Superliga club OB on a deal until June 2025.

References

External links
 
 
 

1999 births
Living people
Association football defenders
Serbian footballers
Serbian expatriate footballers
Serbia youth international footballers
FK Spartak Subotica players
FK Brodarac players
Odense Boldklub players
Serbian SuperLiga players
People from Bačka Topola
Serbian expatriate sportspeople in Denmark
Expatriate men's footballers in Denmark
Danish Superliga players